Allerby is a hamlet in the civil parish of Oughterside and Allerby, Allerdale district, Cumbria, England.

Etymology
Allerby was originally called " 'Ailward's', that is 'Æðelward's, Crosby', afterwards reduced to 'Ailward's bȳ'." So, "the village or hamlet of Ailward". ( is Old English from the Old Norse , meaning 'village' or 'hamlet'.)

References

External links

  Cumbria County History Trust: Oughterside & Allerby (nb: provisional research only - see Talk page)

Villages in Cumbria
Allerdale